A total solar eclipse will occur on July 5, 2168. A solar eclipse occurs when the Moon passes between Earth and the Sun, thereby totally or partly obscuring the image of the Sun for a viewer on Earth. A total solar eclipse occurs when the Moon's apparent diameter is larger than the Sun's, blocking all direct sunlight, turning day into darkness. Totality occurs in a narrow path across Earth's surface, with the partial solar eclipse visible over a surrounding region thousands of kilometres wide.
Lasting a maximum of 7 minutes, 26 seconds, it will surpass the longest eclipse of the 11th century, which lasted 7 minutes and 20 seconds, though be surpassed by the solar eclipse of July 16, 2186 and the next occurrence. This is the largest total solar eclipse of Saros 139. Greatest Eclipse occurs 1,468 km (912 mi) north of the Equator.

Extreme magnitude 
With an eclipse magnitude of 1.0807, this is the largest total solar eclipse in the millennium, also the largest total solar eclipse in Solar Saros 139.

Related eclipses

Saros 139

References 

 NASA Solar eclipses: 2101 to 2200
 NASA graphics
 NASA googlemap of eclipse path

2168 07 05
2168 07 05
2168 07 05
2160s